The MTV Asia Awards 2003 was held on January 24, 2003, at the Singapore Indoor Stadium in Singapore. The event was the second edition of the MTV Asia Awards, and was hosted by Shaggy and Coco Lee.

International awards

Favorite Pop Act

A1
Blue
Destiny's Child
No Doubt
Westlife

Favorite Rock Act
Coldplay
Creed
Linkin Park
Oasis
Red Hot Chili Peppers

Favorite Video
Britney Spears — "I Love Rock 'n' Roll"
Coldplay — "In My Place"
Eminem — "Without Me"
Kylie Minogue — "Can't Get You Out of My Head"
Linkin Park — "Pts.OF.Athrty"

Favorite Female Artist
Avril Lavigne
Kylie Minogue
Jennifer Lopez
Pink
Shakira

Favorite Male Artist
Eminem
Enrique Iglesias
Moby
Robbie Williams
Ronan Keating

Favorite Breakthrough Artist
Avril Lavigne
Blue
Michelle Branch
Norah Jones
Shakira

Regional awards

Favorite Artist Mainland China
Man Wenjun
Man Jiang
Sun Yue
Lao Lang
Yu Quan

Favorite Artist Hong Kong
Eason Chan
Kelly Chen
Sammi Cheng
Twins
Miriam Yeung

Favorite Artist India
A. R. Rahman
Adnan Sami
Alisha Chinai
Bombay Vikings
Instant Karma

Favorite Artist Indonesia
Cokelat
Dewa
Iwan Fals
Slank
Sheila on 7

Favorite Artist Korea
BoA
G.o.d
JtL
Kangta
Shinhwa

Favorite Artist Malaysia
Ella
Exists
Liza Hanim
OAG
Siti Nurhaliza

Favorite Artist Philippines
Aiza Seguerra
Ogie Alcasid
Parokya ni Edgar
Regine Velasquez
Slapshock

Favorite Artist Singapore
A-do
Ho Yeow Sun
Kit Chan
Stefanie Sun
Urban Xchange

Favorite Artist Taiwan
A-mei
Elva Hsiao
Jay Chou
S.H.E
David Tao

Favorite Artist Thailand
D2B
Palmy
Peter Corp Dyrendal
Silly Fools
Soul After Six

Special awards

Asian Film Award
Devdas

The Style Award
Avril Lavigne

The Inspiration Award
F4

MTV Asia Awards
2003 music awards